Moses David Cobnan (born 10 September 2002) is a Nigerian professional footballer who plays as a forward for Russian club FC Krasnodar.

Club career

ŠKF Sereď
Cobnan made his professional Fortuna Liga debut for ŠKF Sereď against FK Senica on 11 September 2021.

Krasnodar
On 5 January 2023, Russian Premier League club FC Krasnodar announced the signing of Cobnan to a contract lasting until June 2026. The contract was signed on 15 January 2023.

References

External links
 
 Footballdatabase Profile
 Moses Cobnan at Krasnodar

2002 births
Living people
Nigerian footballers
Nigerian expatriate footballers
Association football midfielders
ŠKF Sereď players
FK Slovan Duslo Šaľa players
FK Železiarne Podbrezová players
FC Krasnodar players
Slovak Super Liga players
Russian Premier League players
Expatriate footballers in Slovakia
Nigerian expatriate sportspeople in Slovakia
Expatriate footballers in Russia
Nigerian expatriate sportspeople in Russia